Bruzovice is a municipality and village in Frýdek-Místek District in the Moravian-Silesian Region of the Czech Republic. It has about 1,000 inhabitants.

Etymology
The village was named after its founder Oldřich Brus.

Geography
Bruzovice lies in the Moravian-Silesian Foothills, in the historical region of Cieszyn Silesia.

History
The creation of the village was a part of a larger settlement campaign taking place in the late 13th century on the territory of what will be later known as Upper Silesia. The first written mention of Bruzovice is in a Latin document of Diocese of Wrocław called Liber fundationis episcopatus Vratislaviensis from 1305 as Bruschowitz.

Politically the village belonged initially to the Duchy of Teschen and was ruled by a local branch of Piast dynasty. In 1327 the duchy became a fee of Kingdom of Bohemia, which after 1526 became part of the Habsburg monarchy.

The village became a seat of a Catholic parish, mentioned in the register of Peter's Pence payment from 1447 among 50 parishes of Teschen deaconry as Bransowicz.

In 1573 it was sold as one of 16 villages and the town of Friedeck and formed a state country split from the Duchy of Teschen.

After World War I and fall of Austria-Hungary it became a part of Czechoslovakia. In March 1939 it became a part of Protectorate of Bohemia and Moravia. After World War II it was restored to Czechoslovakia.

References

External links

 

Villages in Frýdek-Místek District
Cieszyn Silesia